The 2011–12 Drexel Dragons men's basketball team represented Drexel University during the 2011–12 NCAA Division I men's basketball season. The Dragons, led by 11th year head coach Bruiser Flint, played their home games at Daskalakis Athletic Center and are members of the Colonial Athletic Association. They finished the season 29–7, 16–2 in CAA play to be crowned CAA regular season champions. They lost in the championship game of the CAA Basketball tournament to VCU. As a conference champion who failed to win their conference tournament, they received an automatic bid into the 2012 NIT where they defeated UCF in the first round and Northern Iowa in the second round before falling in the quarterfinals to Massachusetts.

Pre-season

Class of 2011 commitments

Roster

Schedule

|-
!colspan=9 style="background:#F5CF47; color:#002663;"| Regular Season

|-
!colspan=9 style="background:#F5CF47; color:#002663;"| 2012 CAA men's basketball tournament

|-
!colspan=9 style="background:#F5CF47; color:#002663;"| 2012 NIT

Rankings

Awards
Bruiser Flint
CAA Coach Of The Year

Samme Givens
CAA All-Conference Second Team
CAA Player of the Week

Damion Lee
CAA Rookie of the Year
CAA All-Rookie Team
CAA All-Tournament Team
CAA Rookie of the Week (4)

Frantz Massenat
CAA All-Conference First Team
CAA All-Tournament Team
CAA Player of the Week

References

Drexel Dragons men's basketball seasons
Drexel
Drexel
Drexel
Drexel